HMS Elizabeth was a 70-gun third rate ship of the line of the Royal Navy, built at Woolwich Dockyard and launched on 1 August 1706.

On 4 September 1733 orders were issued directing Elizabeth to be taken to pieces and rebuilt according to the 1733 proposals of the 1719 Establishment at Chatham, from where she was relaunched on 29 November 1737.

Elizabeth continued to serve until 1766, when she was broken up.

Notes

References

Lavery, Brian (2003) The Ship of the Line - Volume 1: The development of the battlefleet 1650-1850. Conway Maritime Press. .

External links
 

Ships of the line of the Royal Navy
1700s ships